Frenchtown Pond State Park is a public recreation area located  northwest of Missoula in Frenchtown, Montana. The  day-use state park offers fishing, swimming, and non-motorized boating on a small, spring-fed lake with a maximum  depth.

References

External links
Frenchtown Pond State Park Montana Fish, Wildlife & Parks
Frenchtown Pond State Park Trail Map Montana Fish, Wildlife & Parks

State parks of Montana
Protected areas of Missoula County, Montana
Protected areas established in 1972
1972 establishments in Montana